Lea Gabrielle (born March 19, 1975) is a former U.S. Diplomat who served as the Special Envoy and Coordinator of the Global Engagement Center at the U.S. Department of State from 2019-2021. She formerly served in the United States Navy for twelve years as a combat naval aviator and intelligence officer. As a civilian, she worked as a journalist and correspondent for the Fox News Channel and as a general-assignment reporter for Shepard Smith Reporting. On February 7, 2019, it was announced she would head up the U.S. Department of State's Global Engagement Center (GEC), tasked with countering propaganda from foreign actors such as Russia, China, North Korea, and ISIS.  She has served in the position of Special Envoy and Coordinator of the GEC since February 11, 2019.

Background
While attending Mount Vernon High School in Fairfax County, Virginia, Gabrielle was named a finalist in the Westinghouse Science Talent Search.  She is a 1997 graduate of the United States Naval Academy, earning a Bachelor of Science in mechanical engineering. Entering the active-duty Navy after graduation, Gabrielle attended the U.S. Navy Flight School at Naval Air Station Pensacola in Florida from 1998 to 2000, earning her Naval Aviator Wings. She is also qualified with an instrument rating and as a commercial pilot.

Her call sign as a pilot was "Flower". Additional duties were as a landing signal officer (LSO) and as a squadron public affairs officer. She also served as an intelligence operations officer during Operation Enduring Freedom, and while in Afghanistan, she was embedded with a Navy SEAL unit conducting intelligence operations. She was also a defense foreign liaison officer.

Journalism career
After leaving the Navy, Gabrielle attended the New York Film Academy in 2009, receiving a digital journalism certificate. She then worked for NBC News (2010-2011) in Washington, D.C. where she shot, wrote, edited, and produced packages for NBC Nightly News, The Today Show, NBC websites, and web spots. As a digital journalist and editor (Avid), Gabrielle covered stories for the NBC Nightly News web page and nationwide NBC affiliates. She conducted interviews for White House and Political Correspondents and Nightly News (including the President, the first female governor in Afghanistan, and GOP Presidential nominees).

In September 2011, Gabrielle moved to San Diego, California, and became a military reporter for KNSD-TV (NBC 7), using the name Lea Sutton. She joined Fox News Channel in New York City in December 2013.

References

Meet Lea Gabrielle, Fox News Correspondent and Aviation Expert

External links
 US Department of State Biography
 Fox News Profile
 KNSD
 Linkedin Profile
 From F/A-18s to Fox News

1975 births
Living people
American television reporters and correspondents
Fox News people
American women television journalists
United States Navy personnel of the War in Afghanistan (2001–2021)
Women in 21st-century warfare
Women war correspondents
Military personnel from Alexandria, Virginia
Journalists from Virginia
Commercial aviators
United States Naval Academy alumni
United States Naval Aviators
Female United States Navy officers
American women commercial aviators
Aviators from Virginia
Women United States Naval Aviators
21st-century American women